Silicon Grail was once a company developing compositing software for filmmakers and post-production professionals. Its main products were Chalice and RAYZ, both high-end compositing applications. The company was acquired by Apple in 2002.  After the buyout Apple discontinued the software.

References 

Apple Inc. acquisitions
Defunct software companies of the United States